Caucasochasma is an extinct genus of basking sharks that lived during the Oligocene. It contains one valid species, C. zherikhini. It is known from a mostly-complete skeleton from the Pshekha Formation of Russia. It has a body plan more similar to sand sharks than to extant basking sharks, which indicates that it was a benthic filter feeder.

References

Cetorhinidae
Prehistoric shark genera